was a Sengoku period mountain-top castle in Takatsuki, Osaka Prefecture, Japan. Located on a 182.6 meter mountain.

History
Akutagawayama Castle was built by Hosokawa Takakuni but was later taken control of by the Miyoshi clan.

It was the original base of power for the Miyoshi clan before Miyoshi Nagayoshi moved to Iimoriyama Castle. After Nagayoshi left the castle, his son Miyoshi Yoshioki was in charge of the Castle.

Literature

Preservation 
The castle is now only ruins, with some stone walls, moats and Dobashibridges.

The castle was listed as one of the Continued Top 100 Japanese Castles in 2017.

Access
The castle ruins can be reached by bus from the Takatsuki Station.

References

Castles in Osaka Prefecture
Former castles in Japan
Ruined castles in Japan
Miyoshi clan
1510s establishments in Japan